Jay Rabinowitz is an American film editor and commercial editor. He is certified by the American Cinema Editors.

Rabinowitz studied at New York University, where he graduated in 1984 with a Bachelor of Fine Arts degree from the undergraduate Cinema Studies program. During the program he learned of a film in pre-production that needed an intern, which turned out to be Jim Jarmusch's Down by Law (1986). He is credited as the assistant editor for several films in the next years, including Jarmusch's Mystery Train (1989-edited by Melody London).

Starting with Night on Earth (1991), Rabinowitz has been the editor for seven of Jarmusch's films: Dead Man (1995), Year of the Horse (1997), Ghost Dog: The Way of the Samurai (1999), Coffee and Cigarettes (2003),  Broken Flowers (2005), and The Limits of Control (2009). Rabinowitz was nominated for an "Eddie" award of the American Cinema Editors for Year of the Horse (Best Edited Documentary Film category).

His other credits as film editor include Mark Webber's directorial debut Explicit Ills; Todd Haynes' I'm Not There; Frank Oz' The Stepford Wives; Adam Bhala Lough's Bomb the System (for which he was honored with the Best Editing award at the Milan Film Festival) and Weapons; and Curtis Hanson's Academy Award-winning 8 Mile.

Mr. Rabinowitz' editing for Darren Aronofsky's Requiem for a Dream (2000) won best editing awards from the Phoenix Film Critics Society and from the Online Film Critics Society. The film was listed as the 29th best-edited film of all time in a 2012 survey of members of the Motion Picture Editors Guild. He was nominated for the Online Film Critics' award for Mr. Aronofsky's The Fountain (2006).

He also functioned as music editor on Explicit Ills; Bomb the System; Weapons; Big Bad Love; Requiem for a Dream; When Pigs Fly; and Mr. Jarmusch's Broken Flowers, Coffee and Cigarettes, and Ghost Dog: The Way of the Samurai.

For Barry Levinson and Tom Fontana, he edited numerous episodes of the television series Oz and Homicide: Life on the Street. Mr. Rabinowitz worked with legendary photographer Robert Frank on the latter's film Last Supper.

In the year 2000 Rabinowitz was awarded at the Online Film Critics Society Award for Best Editing for his work on Requiem for a Dream and in 2011 for his work on The Tree of Life.

In 2012, the Motion Picture Editors Guild included two films edited by Rabinowitz in its listing of the best-edited films of all time. Requiem for a Dream (2000) was 29th, and The Tree of Life (2011) was 65th.

In 2019, he received the Sophia Lifetime Achievement Award from the Portuguese Academy of Motion Pictures Arts & Sciences (Academia Portuguesa das Artes e Ciências Cinematográficas).

Filmography 
The directors for some of these films are indicated in parenthesis.
 1991: Night on Earth
 1992: Last Supper (Robert Frank)
 1993: Clean, Shaven
 1993: When Pigs Fly (Sara Driver)
 1994: Jimmy Hollywood
 1995: Dead Man
 1996: Mother Night
 1997: Year of the Horse
 1997: Affliction
 1993–1998: Homicide: Life on the Street (TV series)
 1999: Ghost Dog: The Way of the Samurai
 2000: Requiem for a Dream
 2001: Big Bad Love
 2002: 8 Mile
 2002: Bomb the System
 2003: Coffee and Cigarettes
 2004: The Stepford Wives
 2005: Dawn Anna (TV movie)
 2005: Broken Flowers
 2006: The Fountain
 2007: Weapons
 2007: I'm Not There
 2008: Explicit Ills
 2009: The Limits of Control
 2009: Women Without Men
 2011: The Adjustment Bureau
 2011: The Tree of Life
 2011: Rampart
 2014: Rosewater
 2016: Junction 48
 2016: Codes of Conduct (TV series)
 2017: The New Radical (Adam Bhala Lough)
 2018: Boy Erased
 2020: Irresistible

References

Further reading 
A short biography and links to six video clips with Rabinowitz: 
Tim Dirks includes the concluding scenes from Requiem for a Dream in his list "Best Film Editing Sequences". See 
An appreciation of the editing in Requiem for a Dream: 
Another appreciation of the editing in 'Requiem':

External links 

20th-century births
American Cinema Editors
Living people
Year of birth missing (living people)